The men's 10,000 metres walk event at the 1992 World Junior Championships in Athletics was held in Seoul, Korea, at Olympic Stadium on 16 September.

Medalists

Results

Final
16 September

Participation
According to an unofficial count, 22 athletes from 16 countries participated in the event.

References

10,000 metres walk
Racewalking at the World Athletics U20 Championships